Hatchettite (also mountain tallow, mineral tallow, mineral adipocire, or adipocerite) is a mineral hydrocarbon.  It has been claimed to be the same as evenkite.

Characteristics
Hatchettite occurs in the coal measures of Belgium and elsewhere, occupying in some cases the interior of hollow concretions of iron-ore, but more generally the cavities of fossil shells or crevices in the rocks.
It is of yellow colour, and translucent, but darkens and becomes opaque on exposure. It has no odour, is greasy to the touch, and has a slightly glistening lustre. Its hardness is that of soft wax. The melting point is 46 to 47 °C, and the composition is C 85.55 %, H 14.45 %.

See also
 Ozocerite

References

 
 

Minerals